Ozello is an unincorporated community in Citrus County, Florida, United States, located between Crystal River and Homosassa on the state's west coast.

The population in 1900 was 49; in 1890, it was zero.

Ozello consists of several keys which are connected by The Ozello Trail (C.R. 494) a twisting roadway that has several sharp curves running west off of U.S. 19-98. The trail is very popular with motorcyclists, and features a great deal of wildlife scenery.

References

External links
Google map
Ozello.net

Populated coastal places in Florida on the Gulf of Mexico
Unincorporated communities in Citrus County, Florida
Unincorporated communities in Florida